The 2001–02 NBA season was the Pacers' 26th season in the National Basketball Association, and 35th season as a franchise. During the off-season, the Pacers acquired first round draft pick Jamaal Tinsley from the Atlanta Hawks, who had acquired him from the Memphis Grizzlies, and signed free agent Carlos Rogers. The Pacers won six of their first eight games, but then lost seven of their next nine games and played around .500 for most of the first half of the season, holding a 25–25 record at the All-Star break. At midseason, the team traded Jalen Rose and Travis Best to the Chicago Bulls in exchange for Ron Artest, Brad Miller and Ron Mercer. With a 37–40 record in mid April, the Pacers would win their final five games of the regular season, and sneak into the playoffs as the #8 seed in the Eastern Conference, finishing fourth in the Central Division with a 42–40 record.

Jermaine O'Neal was named Most Improved Player of the Year, averaging 19.0 points, 10.5 rebounds and 2.3 blocks per game. He was also named to the All-NBA Third Team, and selected for the 2002 NBA All-Star Game. In addition, Reggie Miller finished second on the team in scoring with 16.5 points per game, while Al Harrington played a sixth man role averaging 13.1 points and 6.3 rebounds per game off the bench, but was out for the remainder of the season with a torn ACL after 44 games. Tinsley averaged 9.4 points, 8.1 assists and 1.7 steals per game, and was named to the NBA All-Rookie Second Team.

However, in the Eastern Conference First Round of the playoffs, the Pacers would lose in five games to the top-seeded New Jersey Nets, including a double overtime road loss in Game 5, which the Nets won 120–109. The Nets would go on to reach the NBA Finals for the first time, but would lose to the Los Angeles Lakers in four straight games. Following the season, Rogers was released to free agency.

Offseason

Draft picks

Roster

Regular season

Season standings

Record vs. opponents

Game log

Playoffs

|- align="center" bgcolor="#ccffcc"
| 1
| April 20
| @ New Jersey
| W 89–83
| Jermaine O'Neal (30)
| Brad Miller (12)
| Jamaal Tinsley (7)
| Continental Airlines Arena18,555
| 1–0
|- align="center" bgcolor="#ffcccc"
| 2
| April 22
| @ New Jersey
| L 79–95
| Reggie Miller (26)
| Artest, O'Neal (6)
| Jamaal Tinsley (5)
| Continental Airlines Arena20,049
| 1–1
|- align="center" bgcolor="#ffcccc"
| 3
| April 26
| New Jersey
| L 84–85
| Reggie Miller (30)
| Jeff Foster (12)
| Jamaal Tinsley (9)
| Conseco Fieldhouse18,345
| 1–2
|- align="center" bgcolor="#ccffcc"
| 4
| April 30
| New Jersey
| W 97–74
| Artest, Croshere (18)
| Artest, B. Miller (8)
| Kevin Ollie (9)
| Conseco Fieldhouse18,345
| 2–2
|- align="center" bgcolor="#ffcccc"
| 5
| May 2
| @ New Jersey
| L 109–120 (2OT)
| Reggie Miller (31)
| Brad Miller (17)
| Kevin Ollie (8)
| Continental Airlines Arena20,049
| 2–3
|-

Player statistics

Season

Playoffs

Player Statistics Citation:

Awards and records
 Jermaine O'Neal, NBA Most Improved Player Award
 Jermaine O'Neal, NBA All-Star Game
 Jermaine O'Neal, All-NBA Third Team
 Jamaal Tinsley, NBA All-Rookie Team 2nd Team

Transactions

Trades

Player Transactions Citation:

References

Indiana Pacers seasons
Pace
Pace
Indiana